Thomas Fancutt (born 25 February 1995) is an Australian tennis player.

Fancutt has a career high ATP singles ranking of 491 achieved on 28 January 2019. He also has a career high ATP doubles ranking of 276 achieved on 2 December 2018.

Fancutt made his ATP main draw debut at the 2021 Great Ocean Road Open, where he was an alternate into the singles main draw.

Personal life
Fancutt comes from a tennis-playing family, with his grandfather Trevor, grandmother Daphne, uncles Charlie and Michael and father Chris all former professional tennis players.

Career

2013–2020: Career Beginnings
Fancutt made his debut on the ITF circuit at the Australia F6 in September 2013.

Fancutt won his first ITF title in Anning, China in July 2016.

2021: ATP debut
In February 2021, Fancutt made his ATP tour main draw debut at the 2021 Great Ocean Road Open.

ATP Challengers and ITF Futures finals

Singles: 7 (2–5)

Doubles: 35 (21 titles, 14 runners-up)

References

External links

1995 births
Living people
Australian male tennis players
Tennis players from Brisbane
Australian people of South African descent
21st-century Australian people